Isaac Souza Filho (born 23 June 1999) is a Brazilian diver. He competed in the 2020 Summer Olympics.

At the 2019 Pan American Games, he won a bronze medal in the Men's synchronized 10 metre platform.

At the 2020 Olympic Games in Tokyo, he finished 20th in the Men's 10 metre platform.

References

External links

1999 births
Living people
Brazilian male divers
Olympic divers of Brazil
Divers at the 2020 Summer Olympics
Sportspeople from Rio de Janeiro (city)
Pan American Games medalists in diving
Medalists at the 2019 Pan American Games
Pan American Games bronze medalists for Brazil
21st-century Brazilian people